The Men's Freestyle 57 kg competition of the Wrestling events at the 2015 Pan American Games in Toronto were held on July 17 at the Mississauga Sports Centre.

Canadian wrestler John Pineda was scheduled to be among the participants, but he did not make weight and had to withdraw from the event.

Schedule
All times are Eastern Daylight Time (UTC-4).

Results
Legend
F — Won by fall

Final

Repechage

References

Wrestling at the 2015 Pan American Games